The Hathaway Brightman House is a historic house located at 205 Crescent Street in Fall River, Massachusetts, in the Border City neighborhood.

Description and history 
It is a -story, wood-framed structure, four bays wide, with a side gable roof that has a front-facing gable with bracketed eave. The house was built in about 1858 and added to the National Register of Historic Places in 1983. It is considered a particularly fine example of a mid-19th century Victorian Gothic cottage. It features a "pine tree" Palladian window above the entrance.

See also
National Register of Historic Places listings in Fall River, Massachusetts

References

Houses in Fall River, Massachusetts
National Register of Historic Places in Fall River, Massachusetts
Houses on the National Register of Historic Places in Bristol County, Massachusetts